Lidziya Marozava and Andreea Mitu were the defending champions but Marozava chose not to participate. Mitu partnered alongside Oksana Kalashnikova but lost in the semifinals to Katharina Gerlach and Natalija Stevanović.

Katarzyna Piter and Kimberley Zimmermann won the title, defeating Gerlach and Stevanović in the final, 6–1, 6–1.

Seeds

Draw

Draw

References
Main Draw

Oeiras Ladies Open - Doubles